Vilakku Vacha Nerathula is an Indian Tamil-language soap opera that aired on Kalaignar TV. The show premiered on 18 January 2009. It aired Monday through Friday at 8:00PM IST. The show starring by Sujitha, Sanjeev, Anuradha Krishnamoorthy, Kaushik and Delhi Kumar.

The show Written and Screenplay by K. Bhagyaraj, Directed by C. Ranganathan and Production by Ever Smile. The show last aired on 10 October 2012 and ended with 287 episodes.

Plot
An educated girl named Pavithra lives in a village where her father runs a finance company. Pavithra's mother wants her married to her brother's son. Due to some misunderstanding the families are not in terms with each other. So Pavithra's family decided to avoid this and began to look for another proposal for her. Pavithra's mother visits an astrologer for advice. In the meanwhile Pratap, a NRI from Singapore meets Pavithra at a bus stop and falls in love with her . Before leaving to Singapore he asks his friend to gather information about Pavithra. Mentally challenged Chelladurai, a landlord in Pavithra's village along with his mother. Chelladurai mother believes that marriage will solve his problems. On seeing Pavithra's horoscope the astrologer tells her mother about some problem. After hearing this Pavithra's mother hides what the astrologer told her. The story unfolds from here.

Cast

Main cast

 Sujitha as Pavithira
 Sanjeev
 Kaushik

Additional cast

 Anuradha Krishnamoorthy
 Delhi Kumar
 Sivan Srinivasan
 Kalaranjani
 Koushik
 Dev Anand
 Baboos
 Kaveri
 Theni Rajesh
 Sundari
 Sruthi
 Sathya
 Banumathi

Airing history 
The show started airing on Kalaignar TV on 18 January 2010. It aired on Monday to Friday 8:00PM. Later its timing changed to Monday to Friday at 9:30PM.

International broadcast
  It aired in the Indian state of Andhra Pradesh on RVS TV Dubbed in Telugu language.
  In Indian Tamil Channel on Mega TV

References

External links
 

Kalaignar TV television series
2009 Tamil-language television series debuts
2012 Tamil-language television series endings
Tamil-language television shows